John Rea (January 27, 1755 – February 26, 1829) was an early 19th-century American politician.  Rea was born at "Rea’s Mansion," near Chambersburg, Pennsylvania
Rea served as lieutenant and captain with the Cumberland County Militia during the Revolutionary War.  On October 20, 1784, Rea was commissioned the first coroner of Franklin County, Pennsylvania.

Soon after, he was elected to Pennsylvania House of Representatives in 1785, 1786, 1789, 1790, 1792, 1793, 1801, and 1802.  Also, Rea was the county auditor in 1793 and 1794.

He was elected as a Republican for the state of Pennsylvania to the Eight Congress and also served in the three succeeding Congresses (March 4, 1803 – March 3, 1810).  He then served in the War of 1812 as major general of the Eleventh Division of Militia.

Following the death of Robert Whitehill, Rea was elected to  the Thirteenth Congress, and served from May 11, 1813 until March 3, 1815.  He then became a member of the Pennsylvania State Senate, serving in 1823 and 1824, when he resigned.

Rea died in Chambersburg, Pennsylvania, on February 26, 1829.  He is currently buried at Rocky Spring Churchyard, near Chambersburg, Pennsylvania.

External links

The Political Graveyard
 

1755 births
1829 deaths
Pennsylvania state senators
Members of the Pennsylvania House of Representatives
American militia generals
Pennsylvania militiamen in the American Revolution
People from Chambersburg, Pennsylvania
Democratic-Republican Party members of the United States House of Representatives from Pennsylvania
People of colonial Pennsylvania